Events in the year 1888 in China.

Incumbents
 Guangxu Emperor (14th year)
 Regent: Empress Dowager Cixi

Events
 Sikkim expedition, an 1888 British military expedition to expel Tibetan forces from Sikkim in present-day northeast India.
 March 12 — Qing government signed a treaty with the US banning Chinese laborers from entering the US in accordance with the Chinese Exclusion Act
 Lingnan University established in Canton, Kwangtung Province, China (now Guangzhou, Guangdong Province, People's Republic of China). It was a private university established by a group of American missionaries in 1888
 October 1 — The Scott Act (1888) signed into law, was a United States law that prohibited Chinese laborers abroad or who planned future travels from returning, met with opposition in China, especially Guangdong

Births
 Zhan Dabei (1888, Hubei - 1927) was a Chinese revolutionary and politician. He was an anti-Manchu rebel active at the time of the 1911 Revolution

References

 
1880s in China
Years of the 19th century in China